Harrison Graham  "Skip" Pope, Jr. (born 1947, in Massachusetts), is an American professor and physician, currently Professor of Psychiatry at Harvard Medical School and an attending physician at McLean Hospital. He is also the Director, Biological Psychiatry Laboratory at McLean's.  According to the ISI index, he is one of the most highly cited psychiatrists of the 20th century.  Pope's research focus is on substance abuse, especially anabolic steroids, marijuana, hallucinogens, and MDMA. In his book the Adonis Complex, he argues that the media fuels body image disorders for not only women but men as well. He has also written extensively about repressed memory and recovered memory controversy, arguing that repressed memory does not exist.  Pope has been a pioneer in designing the first randomized clinical trials of several currently accepted treatments for psychiatric disorders.

Education 
 1969 BA Harvard College
 1972 MPH Harvard School of Public Health
 1974 MD Harvard Medical School

See also
 Muscle dysmorphia, the trauma referred by him as "bigorexia", described in Adonis Complex

Bibliography
Olivardia, R., Pope, H.G., Borowiecki, J.J., & Cohane, G.H. (2004). Biceps and body image: The relationship between muscularity and self-esteem, depression, and eating disorder symptoms. Psychology of men and masculinity, 5, 112–120.
Pope, H.G., Phillips, K.A., & Olivardia, R. (2000). The Adonis complex: The secret crisis of male body obsession. Sydney: The Free Press.

External links
Bio at McLean Hospital Website
Bio at Harvard's McLean Hospital Website
ISI Highly Cited Researchers: Pope, Harrison Graham

1950 births
American psychiatrists
Phillips Exeter Academy alumni
Harvard School of Public Health alumni
Harvard Medical School alumni
Harvard Medical School faculty
Living people
Bipolar disorder researchers
Harvard College alumni
McLean Hospital physicians